The Blue Springs Police Department (BSPD) is the principal law enforcement agency in Blue Springs, Missouri, and serves a city with a population of 58,604 .  The department's jurisdiction is the incorporated city limits of the City of Blue Springs, Missouri, and it is located in Jackson County east of Kansas City.  The Blue Springs Police Department has 102 sworn law enforcement officers.

History
The Blue Springs Missouri Police Department was formed by the City of Blue Springs, Missouri in December 1966 and started with just three full time employee's serving under 5,000 residents.  Prior to the formation of the police department the City of Blue Springs had an elected City Marshall.  The elected City Marshall had deputy city Marshall's who worked for him.  Until 1966 the City Marshall worked out of a small block building that was under the old water tower at 11th and Smith Street's. The small white block building held all city functions at this time, from City Clerk, to the water department etc. There was also a one-room, small building, known as the "city jail", which was built in 1923 or 1924.  The old "city jail" was located near today's 12th and Smith Streets, between 12th Street and the railroad tracks behind the old lumber yard.  It is unclear if the "city jail" was ever really used as a jail, but was for sure never used as a jail past the 1950s and was razed in the mid-1980s.

Howard L. Brown - deceased was elected as City Marshall of Blue Springs in 1965 and was appointed as the first Chief of Police in December 1966.  Brown started his law enforcement career in 1955 as a member of the Missouri State Highway Patrol, and served as the Chief of Police from December 1966 to November 2001 when he retired after serving the community for 35 years.

From the formation of the BSPD in 1966 to 1968, the police department was located in the Old Blue Springs City Hall, which was a metal building located in the 200 block of NW 11th Street.  From 1968 to 1988 BSPD was located on the lower level of the Blue Springs Municipal Building, known today as the Blue Springs City Hall, located at 903 W. Main Street.  BSPD out grew its space on the lower level of City Hall by the 1980s and in 1988 BSPD moved to a brand new facility, the Howard L. Brown Public Safety Building, located at 1100 SW Smith Street.

BSPD was the first agency in the State of Missouri to have a 911 emergency communications center serving as a pilot program in 1975. BSPD formed the Community Youth Outreach Unit, "CYOU" in the mid-1990s.  The unit, in which officers were in regular, friendly contact with teenagers, was regarded as successful at keeping youth crime in check. 

BSPD once required all police officers to be licensed EMTs.  Police officers would often drive the ambulance as an EMT to or from an EMS call.  The City of Blue Springs had Paramedics on duty but they were assisted by the on duty Police Officer's/EMT's.  This practice stopped in 1992 when the City of Blue Springs turned over the operation of the ambulance service to the Central Jackson County Fire Protection District.

In April 2011, voters passed the 1/2 cent dedicated Public Safety Sales Tax to address needs found in the Public Safety Citizen's Advisory Board analysis.  Revenues produced from the public safety sales tax will only be used for public safety purposes.  The tax cannot be used for other General Fund programs or services.  As part of the P.S.S.T. tax a renovation and massive expansion of Blue Springs Police Department building was completed in late 2015.  The renovation and expansion doubled the size of the old building.  Today BSPD has 100 sworn officers and 40 civilian support staff, totalling 140 employees.

Past city marshals
(City platted at present site 1879)
1880 - John K Parr / Dep Marshal TJ Walker
September 1, 1923 until November 5, 1923 - Alonzo Hertig, City Marshal Appointed, who was killed in the line of duty.
Early 1950s – Earl Nance, City Marshal Elected
Early to mid-1950s – Eddie Trundle, City Marshal Elected
Mid 1950s to 1965 – Pete Hearn, City Marshal Elected
1965 to December 1966 – Howard L. Brown, City Marshal Elected, was the last City Marshal and first Chief of Police.

Past and present chiefs of police
December 1966 to November 2001 – Howard L. Brown, 1st Chief of Police, Deceased
November 2001 to May 2002, Robert Ahring, Acting Chief of Police, Retired
May 2002 to October 2017 – Wayne I. McCoy, 2nd Chief of Police, Retired
October 2017 to Present, Robert Muenz, 3rd Chief of Police

Structure
Chief of Police

Deputy Chief of Police

Operations Bureau, 1-Captain
3-Lieutenants
6-Uniformed Sergeants
Uniformed Patrol
Bike Patrol Unit
K-9 Unit
Traffic Unit
Detention
Animal Control
Hostage Negotiation Team 
Drone unit 

Staff Services Bureau, 1-Captain
2-Sergeants
Special Victims Investigations Unit
General Investigations Unit
Special Tactical Assistance Team, "STAT"
Records Unit
Property Unit

Community Youth Outreach Unit, CYOU Bureau, 1-Captain
2-Sergeants
Dispatch
Professional Standards,
Crime Prevention Unit,
School Resource Officers "SROs",
DARE Officers,
Chaplains,
Volunteers in Police Services "VIPS"

Ranks

Vehicles and patrol districts

The BSPD utilizes a variety of vehicles, the following are used for uniform patrol division: the Ford Interceptor, "Taurus" and the Ford Utility, "Explorer".  Animal Control uses the Ford F-250 trucks. Command staff, non uniform supervisors and detectives drive a vast array of unmarked vehicles. 

The Blue Springs Missouri Police Department is divided into four patrol districts.  Two officers are attempted to be assigned to every district.

Fallen officers 

Blue Springs has lost two officers in the line of duty.  A city marshal by gunfire in 1923 and a Municipal Court Bailiff who suffered a fatal heart attack in court in 1972.

On November 5, 1923, 63 year old Blue Springs City Marshal Alonzo Hertig responded to the Blue Springs Telephone Office early in the morning hours in response from a telephone operator requesting assistance after a man created a disturbance in the office and made advances toward the female operator.  After Marshal Hertig's arrival a struggle ensured and Marshal Hertig sustained a gunshot wound to the stomach.  Marshal Hertig, although mortally wounded was able to return fire on the twenty-six year-old suspect.  Marshal Hertig and the suspect died at the scene.  

Marshal Hertig was born in Pennsylvania in 1860.  His father was a French immigrant.  He was educated in the law and served in the profession in Chicago before moving to Blue Springs where he farmed for 23 years.  Following his retirement from farming he was appointed as Blue Springs City Marshal on September 1, 1923, serving for just two months prior to his death.  He was survived by a niece of the home a brother. Service were held in the Blue Springs Methodist Church.

On April 6, 1972 Blue Springs Municipal Court Baliff Elmer "Claude" Mowry was working a municipal court session at the Blue Springs Municipal Building located at 903 West Main Street.  In the middle of court he suffered a fatal heart attack. He was transported to the hospital but died from the heart attack that he suffered while being the bailiff in the municipal court session.  He had recently retired from the Blue Springs Police Department as a police officer.

See also
List of law enforcement agencies in Missouri
List of law enforcement agencies in Kansas

References

External links
Official Website 

Municipal police departments of Missouri
1966 establishments in Missouri